The 1985–86 Memphis State Tigers men's basketball team represented Memphis State University as a member of the Metro Conference during the 1985–86 NCAA Division I men's basketball season.

Memphis State opened the season with 20 consecutive wins and peaked at No. 2 in the AP poll on January 27, 1986. The team went on to finish second in the conference regular season standings and lost in the championship game of the conference tournament (eventual National champion Louisville won both titles). After reaching the Sweet 16 each of the previous four seasons including a Final Four appearance the year prior, the Tigers fell in the second round of the 1986 NCAA Tournament and finished with a 28–6 record (9–3 Metro).

Roster

Schedule and results

|-
!colspan=9 style= | Regular Season

|-
!colspan=9 style= | Metro Conference Tournament

|-
!colspan=9 style= | NCAA Tournament

Rankings

References

Memphis Tigers men's basketball seasons
1985 in sports in Tennessee
1986 in sports in Tennessee
Memphis State
Memphis State